Mandialaza is a rural commune in Madagascar. It belongs to the district of Moramanga, which is a part of Alaotra-Mangoro Region. The population of the commune was 15835 in 2018.

Primary and junior level secondary education are available in town. The majority 93% of the population of the commune are farmers.  The most important crop is rice, while other important products are bananas, beans and cassava.  Services provide employment for 7% of the population.

References

Populated places in Alaotra-Mangoro